Nasriganj is a nagar panchayat town and corresponding community development block situated in Rohtas District of Bihar, India. Located on the banks of the Son River, the town was a vibrant economic hub in the late 19th century.
The town of Nasriganj had a population of 23,819, according to the 2011 Census of India, while the total population of Nasriganj block was 115,117. Besides the town of Nasriganj itself, the block consisted of 53 villages, of which 50 were inhabited and 3 were uninhabited.

Name 
Nasirganj takes its name from a Sufi name Mir Nasir Dehlavi, who came to the village in late 19th century. His mausoleum is situated at the center of Nasriganj.

History 
The town of Nasriganj dates back to 1740, when the eponymous Abdul Nasir settled here on the Arrah-Sasaram road.

Nasriganj was formerly ruled by a local native dynasty. In 1867, the last ruler died without heirs, and the estate escheated to the British government. At this time, it was an important commercial and manufacturing centre, with 21 paper mills and 42 sugar refineries. It lost much of its importance in the ensuing years, and was downgraded from town to village status, but by 1921 it was still described as a notable trade centre, along with nearby Hariharganj. At that time, it possessed a large turbine-powered mill that produced oil, sugar, and flour, and paper was still manufactured on a smaller scale. The population of Nasriganj in 1921 was 5,332.

Nasriganj was raised to nagar panchayat status in 2011.

Economy
Today, the main commodities manufactured in Nasriganj are blankets, furniture, and bricks.

There is a market place named Izhar Market in downtown Nasriganj. This is a big market considering population of the village having more than 30 shops. This market is a big attraction for people coming from nearby villages. Apart from this market, there some more attractions for people nearby. There is a big vegetable and food grain market and produces like potatoes, rice and gur are exported from this market. Beside this there is mini hydro power station on canal. There is one post office, telephone exchange and Nasriganj police station under Dy.S.P.

There are more markets in Nasriganj such as Aslam Market.

The main occupation of people of Nasriganj is fishing.

This whole area has some of the most fertile land of the country and is very well irrigated through a canal network all because of 18th century Zamindar Ram Varan Tiwary . So as well connected via road one side with Dehri-on-sone and other side with Bikramganj. The Son River is one of the widest rivers of the country and remains undried all year. So as the name suggests River Son = sona means gold, it makes the people rich in terms of food and even enriching them in all aspects of life and is like a lifeline for the area. Son River is also one of the cleanest rivers till date in the entire world as there are no industries & major cities upstream of this river, so in one way this river also helps in terms of keeping a check on the Ganges pollution level, as this river merges with the Ganges near Patna for its final journey to the Bay of Bengal.

At present time a famous company is working it is called Baloo Ghat company. It is a mining company of "silicate" which is found in Sone River. It currently (2016) is a main source of income of this block. It is a contract-based company but it has changed the economic culture of this area.

"Ara Line" canal is lifeline of this block. The source of this canal is Sone River and passed through three districts of this area. 180 km long this canal is a basic source of irrigation water.

A very special sweet of Nasriganj is "Khoorma" and "laktho" made from cottage cheese.

There is a "Gandhi Maidan" nearby Sone river. Children go there to play cricket and all other sports.

Academic centers
Nasriganj has one of the oldest high schools in the district Rohtas. It was founded in 1929 and at that time only two other high schools were nearby (namely Osaw High school and Burhwal High School). So this place has been one of the prime location for studying up to high school. This school has now been upgraded up to higher secondary level.

One Girl's high school (Project Girl's High School) is also situated at the bank of the river Sone. This school is for girls up to class 10th.
one agriculture implement maker Annapurna Agro Eng Workshop.
As far as private schools are concerned Nasriganj is flooded with it but any of the private schools is not affiliated to the CBSE ICSE or BSEB.
While many IITians emerges from this native place, there is no college here for Graduation or Higher Studies.

Transport
Nasriganj (Rohtas district) is situated around 6 km west of Daudnagar (Aurangabad district).

Roads
 Sakaddi–Nasriganj (SH-81)
 Nasriganj–Dehri-on-Sone (SH-15)
 Bikramganj–Nasriganj–Gaya (NH-120)

Railway
 Bikramganj railway station (19 km)
 Dehri-on-Sone railway station (21 km)
 Garh Nokha railway station (24 km)

List of villages 
As of 2011, Nasriganj block consisted of 53 villages, of which 50 were inhabited and 3 were uninhabited.

References

External links 
 Map of the town of Nasriganj

Cities and towns in Rohtas district